In statistics, a volcano plot is a type of scatter-plot that is used to quickly identify changes in large data sets composed of replicate data.  It plots significance versus fold-change on the y and x axes, respectively.  These plots are increasingly common in omic experiments such as genomics, proteomics, and metabolomics where one often has a list of many thousands of replicate data points between two conditions and one wishes to quickly identify the most meaningful changes. A volcano plot combines a measure of statistical significance from a statistical test (e.g., a p value from an ANOVA model) with the magnitude of the change, enabling quick visual identification of those data-points (genes, etc.) that display large magnitude changes that are also statistically significant.

A volcano plot is constructed by plotting the negative logarithm of the p value on the y axis (usually base 10). This results in data points with low p values (highly significant) appearing toward the top of the plot. The x axis is the logarithm of the fold change between the two conditions.  The logarithm of the fold change is used so that changes in both directions appear equidistant from the center.  Plotting points in this way results in two regions of interest in the plot: those points that are found toward the top of the plot that are far to either the left- or right-hand sides. These represent values that display large magnitude fold changes (hence being left or right of center) as well as high statistical significance (hence being toward the top).

Additional information can be added by coloring the points according to a third dimension of data (such as signal intensity), but this is not uniformly employed. Volcano plots are also used to graphically display a significance analysis of microarrays (SAM) gene selection criterion, an example of regularization.

The concept of volcano plot can be generalized to other applications, where the x axis is related to a measure of
the strength of a statistical signal, and y axis is related to a measure of the statistical significance of the signal.
For example, in a genetic association case-control study, such as Genome-wide association study,
a point in a volcano plot represents a single-nucleotide polymorphism.
Its x value can be the logarithm of the odds ratio and its y value can be -log10 of the p value from a Chi-square test
or a Chi-square test statistic.

Volcano plots show a characteristic upwards two arm shape because the x axis, i.e. the underlying log2-fold changes, are generally normal distribution whereas the y axis, the log10-p values, tend toward greater significance for fold-changes that deviate more strongly from zero.
The density of the normal distribution takes the form 
 .
So the 

of that is

and the negative 

is

which is a parabola whose arms reach upwards
on the left and right sides.
The upper bound of the data is one parabola
and the lower bound is another parabola.

References

External links
 NCI Documentation describing statistical methods to analyze microarrays, including volcano plots
 Description of volcano plots at MathWorks

Bioinformatics
Statistical charts and diagrams